Romain Bardet (born 9 November 1990) is a French professional racing cyclist who currently rides for UCI WorldTeam . Bardet is known for his climbing and descending abilities, which make him one of the top general classification contenders in Grand Tours.

So far in his career, his best results have primarily come on home soil. He has won three stages in the Tour de France in three separate years running from 2015 to 2017; he placed in the top ten overall for five consecutive years (from 2014 to 2018 and finished on the podium twice: second overall in 2016 and third overall in 2017. He has also worn the Young rider classification jersey, and won the Mountains classification jersey in 2019 as well as the overall Combativity Award in 2015. Outside of France, he won a stage at the 2021 Vuelta a España, and won the general classification at the 2022 Tour of the Alps.

Professional career

AG2R La Mondiale (2012–2020)

2012–2014
Bardet turned professional in 2012. He distinguished himself in that year's Tour of Turkey especially in the 3rd stage, which was a mountain affair, where he attacked relentlessly to finally take fifth place. He also finished fifth overall in the race.

The following season, Bardet rode his first Tour de France and took his first professional victory at the Tour de l'Ain.

His next victory came the following year when he won La Drôme Classic, his first single-day race win. Bardet finished 4th overall at the Volta a Catalunya and also rode his first Critérium du Dauphiné where he finished 5th overall. Going into the Tour de France, Bardet was team leader together with Jean-Christophe Péraud. Bardet climbed to 3rd place overall at the end of the second week, and even had a short stint in the white jersey. Despite losing his podium place in the final week, Bardet still attacked on downhill sections to potentially gain seconds on his rivals. In the end, Bardet finished 6th overall and Péraud finished 2nd overall. Thibaut Pinot took the win in the white jersey standings, in front of Bardet in 2nd place.

2015
After a spring campaign which included a 6th place at Liège–Bastogne–Liège and 9th overall at the Tour de Romandie, Bardet was regarded as one of the outsiders for a podium spot in the Tour de France. In his final stage race before the Tour, the Critérium du Dauphiné, Bardet went on the attack on the downhill section before the last climb on stage 5. He gained a minute on the technical descent, then climbed up to the ski resort of Pra-Loup to win the stage solo, 36 seconds ahead of second-placed Tejay van Garderen. He went on to finish 6th overall at the race.

At the Tour de France, Bardet lost time in the crosswinds in the Netherlands and the team time trial in the first week. When the mountains finally arrived, Bardet lost even more time and with almost half of the race done, out of general classification contention. On the last day in the Pyrenees, he went into the breakaway and finished third in the stage to Plateau de Beille. Bardet and Thibaut Pinot were part of a breakaway and led over the top of the final Côte de la Croix Neuve climb of Stage 14. However, the pair were caught and overtaken by Steve Cummings on the short descent to the finish at Mende Aerodrome, and Bardet finished third in the stage. On 23 July 2015, after a solo breakaway, Bardet won Stage 18, a mountain stage for his first Tour de France stage victory. The next day, he claimed the polka dot jersey for the first time, after finishing fifth in Stage 19, another mountain stage. However, he lost the polka dot jersey to Chris Froome on Stage 20. Bardet finished in ninth place in the final general classification and won the combativity award of the Tour.

2016

In February 2016, Bardet repeatedly attacked Vincenzo Nibali during Stage 4 of the Tour of Oman and ultimately finished the stage in second position, 9 seconds behind him. Bardet finished the Tour of Oman second overall, 15 seconds behind Nibali. In June, Bardet attacked during Stage 6 of Critérium du Dauphiné and ultimately finished second in the stage after being outsprinted by Thibaut Pinot to the finish line in Méribel. After Stage 6, Bardet rose to third overall in the general classification, 21 seconds behind the leader Chris Froome. Bardet finished second overall in the Critérium du Dauphiné final general classification, 12 seconds behind Froome.

On Stage 19 of the Tour de France, Bardet and his team mate Mikaël Cherel attacked together on a wet descent before the penultimate climb. After winning Stage 19, Bardet rose from fifth to second overall in the general classification. He finished the Tour in second position in the final general classification, 4:05 behind Chris Froome, becoming the sixth Frenchman to finish in the top three in the final general classification over the previous 30 editions; the other five were Pinot and Jean-Christophe Péraud (both 2014), Richard Virenque (1996, 1997), Laurent Fignon (1989) and Jean-François Bernard (1987).

Bardet was selected to represent France at the Summer Olympics in the individual road race, finishing 24th.

2017

After crashing on stage 1 of Paris–Nice, Bardet was thrown out of the race after he had been towed by his team car. Bardet struggled throughout the penultimate stage, a  individual time trial, that started and finished in Marseille; he finished in 52nd position, 2 minutes 3 seconds behind its winner Maciej Bodnar. Bardet dropped from second to third in the general classification going into the final stage, with a one-second lead over fourth-placed Mikel Landa. Bardet managed to hold on to his advantage, completing the podium behind Chris Froome and Rigoberto Urán.

2018
Bardet missed the Vuelta a Andalucía after injuring his right arm in a domestic accident. He returned to action with a victory in the Classic Sud-Ardèche in February. In March, Bardet rode the Strade Bianche one day classic, held partly on gravel roads in torrential rain. He broke away with the world cyclocross champion Wout van Aert and the pair led the race for much of the final  before Tiesj Benoot attacked from a chasing group to catch and then drop them in the final sector of dirt roads. Benoot soloed to victory by 39 seconds ahead of Bardet, who dropped van Aert in the final kilometre. At Liège–Bastogne–Liège, Bardet finished 3rd – his first podium at a Cycling monument – after losing the 2nd place sprint to Michael Woods. When riding the Critérium du Dauphiné, Bardet never challenged for the overall win and only entered the top 3 inside the last two days.

When he arrived at the start of the Tour de France, Bardet had a troubled first week with mechanicals and punctures. He lost time on multiple occasions during the first week and was almost two minutes behind when they started the 10th stage. On stage 12 to Alpe d'Huez, Bardet attacked and rode away from the other contenders. He was later joined by Chris Froome, Geraint Thomas and Tom Dumoulin, but decided to test the contenders with numerous accelerations. He ended the stage in 3rd place and rose to 6th place in the general classification. With Bardet only being 8th in the general classification before stage 19, he and several other contenders attacked on the Col du Tourmalet with almost  to the finish line. Despite being caught on the last climb, Bardet finished third in the sprint to the finish line. He moved up to a final placing of sixth overall after the penultimate stage, an individual time trial – his fifth consecutive top-ten finish at the race.

In September, Bardet finished 2nd in the road race at the UCI Road World Championships, after having attacked with Alejandro Valverde (Spain) and Canada's Woods. The group was later joined by Tom Dumoulin (Netherlands) inside the last kilometres. Valverde started the sprint with almost  to the finish line but Bardet never looked like a serious challenge and had to settle with 2nd place.

Team DSM (2021–)

Bardet made his first start at the Giro d'Italia, sharing team leadership with Jai Hindley, the 2020 runner-up. Bardet made his way up the general classification, moving into the top ten overall after stage 14, finishing at the Monte Zoncolan. He finished second to Egan Bernal on stage 16, and moved up to fifth place overall on the penultimate stage, following a fourth-place stage finish. However, he fell to seventh in the general classification during the final-day individual time trial, dropping behind Daniel Martínez and João Almeida. Bardet also rode into the leader's jersey at the Vuelta a Burgos, a preparation race for the Vuelta a España. In spite of his crash on the descent of the Picón Blanco climb, he won the third stage solo to Espinosa de los Monteros, his first in over three years. He held a 45-second lead over Mikel Landa heading into the final stage, but he lost the race lead to Landa after cracking in the final  of the stage; he ultimately finished sixth overall, and won the mountains classification.

On stage 5 of the Vuelta a España, Bardet crashed and lost over twelve minutes; he lost a further thirteen minutes the following day, removing him from overall contention. He then rode solo to the summit finish at Pico Villuercas to claim the stage win, 44 seconds ahead of Jesús Herrada. Bardet held the mountains classification for four days, before the lead passed to his teammate Michael Storer. Bardet and Storer also made it into the breakaway on the penultimate stage; Storer mathematically sealed the mountains jersey ahead of the final time trial, while Bardet finished second in the standings.

Bardet had a strong start to the 2022 Giro d'Italia. He rose as high as 4th place near the end of the second week, being only +0:02 behind Richard Carapaz and João Almeida and +0:06 ahead of eventual winner Jai Hindley. Early into stage 13 he began to feel sick and had to abandon the race. He started the 2022 Tour de France in a similar manner, but this was a bit more surprising as it contained the absolute best competition the sport has to offer. The only riders he lost time to were Vingegaard and Pogačar and he stayed more or less even with or ahead of Thomas, Yates, Quintana and Gaudu being in 4th place as the third week began. On stage 16 he cracked and lost time, dropping down to 9th place. The next day to Peyragudes he recovered and rode strongly, rising back up to 6th. On Hautacam he lost time to some riders, and even though he is known to struggle with the individual time trial, he gained enough time over the next closest riders to have enough time in hand to remain in top 10 range by the end of the race.

Personal life

Bardet lives in Clermont-Ferrand. Alongside his professional cycling career, he began business studies in 2011, in the grande école program adapted to high-level athletes in Grenoble School of Management.

Career achievements

Major results

2009
 5th Overall Tour des Pays de Savoie
2010
 6th Overall Tour de l'Avenir
 8th Overall Tour des Pays de Savoie
 8th Overall Giro delle Regioni
 9th Overall Ronde de l'Isard
1st Stage 4
 10th Piccolo Giro di Lombardia
2011
 1st Stage 5 Tour de l'Avenir
 2nd Overall Tour des Pays de Savoie
1st Stages 2 & 3
 2nd Liège–Bastogne–Liège Espoirs
 4th UCI Under 23 Nations' Cup
 4th Overall Ronde de l'Isard
 6th Overall Giro della Regione Friuli Venezia Giulia
 9th Gran Premio Palio del Recioto
2012
 5th Overall Tour of Turkey
2013
 1st  Overall Tour de l'Ain
1st  Points classification
 3rd Les Boucles du Sud Ardèche
 4th Overall Route du Sud
 5th Overall Tour of Beijing
1st  Young rider classification
 7th Overall Étoile de Bessèges
 Combativity award Stage 9 Tour de France
2014
 1st La Drôme Classic
 1st  Young rider classification, Tour of Oman
 2nd Overall Tour de l'Ain
 4th Overall Volta a Catalunya
 4th Classic Sud-Ardèche
 5th Overall Critérium du Dauphiné
 5th Grand Prix Cycliste de Montréal
 6th Overall Tour de France
Held  after Stages 10–15
 Combativity award Stage 17
 10th Grand Prix d'Ouverture La Marseillaise
 10th Paris–Camembert
 10th Liège–Bastogne–Liège
2015
 3rd International Road Cycling Challenge
 5th Overall Vuelta a Andalucía
 6th Overall Critérium du Dauphiné
1st Stage 5
 6th Liège–Bastogne–Liège
 7th Grand Prix Cycliste de Montréal
 9th Overall Giro del Trentino
 9th Overall Tour de Romandie
 9th Overall Tour de France
1st Stage 18
 Combativity award Stage 18 & Overall
Held  after Stage 19
2016
 2nd Overall Tour de France
1st Stage 19
 2nd Overall Tour of Oman
 2nd Overall Critérium du Dauphiné
 2nd Giro dell'Emilia
 4th Giro di Lombardia
 5th Classic Sud-Ardèche
 6th Overall Volta a Catalunya
 6th Overall Giro del Trentino
 8th UCI World Tour
 8th La Drôme Classic
 9th Overall Paris–Nice
 9th Milano–Torino
2017
 3rd Overall Tour de France
1st Stage 12
 6th Overall Critérium du Dauphiné
 6th Liège–Bastogne–Liège
 10th Overall Volta a Catalunya
  Combativity award Stage 11 Vuelta a España
2018
 1st Classic de l'Ardèche
 2nd  Road race, UCI Road World Championships
 2nd Strade Bianche
 2nd Tour du Finistère
 2nd Giro della Toscana
 3rd Overall Critérium du Dauphiné
 3rd Liège–Bastogne–Liège
 6th Overall Tour de France
 6th Giro dell'Emilia
 8th Overall Deutschland Tour
 8th La Drôme Classic
 8th Grand Prix La Marseillaise
 9th La Flèche Wallonne
2019
 1st  Mountains classification, Tour de France
 2nd Overall Tour du Haut Var
 2nd Mont Ventoux Dénivelé Challenge
 4th Classic Sud-Ardèche
 5th Overall Paris–Nice
 7th La Drôme Classic
 9th Amstel Gold Race
 10th Overall Critérium du Dauphiné
2020
 2nd Overall Tour des Alpes-Maritimes et du Var
 6th Overall Critérium du Dauphiné
 7th Paris–Tours
 8th Overall Route d'Occitanie
2021
 Vuelta a España
1st Stage 14
Held  after Stage 14–17
 5th Overall Giro di Sicilia
 6th Overall Vuelta a Burgos
1st  Mountains classification
1st Stage 3
 7th Overall Giro d'Italia
 8th Overall Tirreno–Adriatico
 8th Giro di Lombardia
 9th Overall Tour of the Alps
2022
 1st  Overall Tour of the Alps
 6th Overall Tour de France
 8th Grand Prix Cycliste de Montréal
 9th Overall UAE Tour
 9th Giro di Lombardia
2023
 7th Overall Paris–Nice
 8th Overall Tour des Alpes-Maritimes et du Var

General classification results timeline

Classics results timeline

Major championships timeline

Awards
 Vélo d'Or français: 2016, 2017

References

External links

 
 
 
 
 
 
 
 

1990 births
Living people
French male cyclists
Olympic cyclists of France
Cyclists at the 2016 Summer Olympics
French Tour de France stage winners
French Vuelta a España stage winners
Sportspeople from Haute-Loire
Cyclists from Auvergne-Rhône-Alpes